Luis Alberto "Berty" Echevarría is a Puerto Rican politician, physician and former mayor of Aguada. Echevarría is affiliated with the New Progressive Party (PNP) and served as mayor from 2005 to 2013.

References

Living people
Mayors of places in Puerto Rico
New Progressive Party (Puerto Rico) politicians
People from Aguada, Puerto Rico
Puerto Rican people of Basque descent
Year of birth missing (living people)